Chervonohrad Raion is a raion (district) of Lviv Oblast, Ukraine. It was created in July 2020 as part of the reform of administrative divisions of Ukraine. The center of the raion is the city of Chervonohrad. Two abolished raions, Radekhiv and Sokal Raions, as well as Chervonohrad Municipality and part of Kamianka-Buzka Raion, were merged into Chervonohrad Raion. Population: .

Subdivisions
At the time of establishment, the raion consisted of 7 hromadas:
 Belz urban hromada with the administration in the city of Belz, transferred from Sokal Raion;
 Chervonohrad urban hromada with the administration in the city of Chervonohrad, transferred from Chervonohrad Municipality;
 Dobrotvir settlement hromada with the administration in the urban-type settlement of Dobrotvir, transferred from Kamianka-Buzka Raion;
 Lopatyn settlement hromada with the administration in the urban-type settlement of Lopatyn, transferred from Radekhiv Raion;
 Radekhiv urban hromada with the administration in the city of Radekhiv, transferred from Radekhiv Raion;
 Sokal urban hromada with the administration in the city of Sokal, transferred from Sokal Raion;
 Velyki Mosty urban hromada with the administration in the city of Velyki Mosty, transferred from Sokal Raion.

References

External links
 Symbols of the New Districts in Ukraine: Chervonohrad Raion as an Example

Raions of Lviv Oblast
Ukrainian raions established during the 2020 administrative reform